Daii or Dhay'yi may be,

Daii people
Daii language